Paucisalibacillus globulus is a Gram-positive, spore-forming, aerobic and motile bacterium from the genus of Paucisalibacillus which has been isolated from potting soil from Portugal.

References

External links 

Type strain of Paucisalibacillus globulus at BacDive -  the Bacterial Diversity Metadatabase

Bacillaceae
Bacteria described in 2006